Minuartia elegans, the elegant stichwort or Ross' stitchwort, is a species of flowering plant. It is found in Canada, the United States and Russia.

References

External links
 
 Minuartia elegans at The Plant List
 Minuartia elegans at Tropicos

elegans
Plants described in 1936
Flora of Canada
Flora of the United States
Flora of Russia